Joseph or Joe Carter may refer to:

Military
 Joseph Carter Abbott (1825–1881), Union general
 Joseph E. Carter (1875–1950), American Medal of Honor recipient
 Joseph F. Carter (1842–1922), American soldier and Medal of Honor recipient

Music
 Joe Carter (guitarist) (1927–2001), slide guitarist
 Joseph Dougherty Carter (1927–2005), member of the Carter Family

Politics
 Joseph Carter (socialist) (1910–1970), American socialist activist
 Joseph C. Carter (born 1956), first African-American National Guard Adjutant General in Massachusetts
 Joseph N. Carter (1843–1913), Chief Justice of the Supreme Court of Illinois
 Joseph O. Carter (1835–1909), Hawaiian politician

Sports
 Joe Carter (end) (1909–1991), National Football League player, 1933–1945
 Joe Carter (running back) (born 1962),  National Football League player, 1984–1986
 Joe Carter (footballer) (1899–1977), English football inside-forward
 Joe Carter (born 1960), Major League Baseball player, 1983–1998
 Joe Carter (cricketer) (born 1992), New Zealand cricketer

Other
 Joe Carter (reporter), American reporter
 Joseph Coleman Carter (born 1941), American historian
 Joseph Henry Carter (1857–1930), British veterinarian
 Joe Carter, pseudonym for Superman creator Jerry Siegel
 Joe Carter (Coronation Street), a character on the UK television series Coronation Street played by Jonathan Wrather